Tony Iommi (born 1948) is an English guitarist, songwriter and producer.

Iommi may also refer to:
Iommi (album), a 2000 album by Tony Iommi featuring various artists

People with the surname
Enio Iommi (1926–2013), Argentine sculptor
Jemma Connor-Iommi (born 1985), English-born Irish footballer, related to Tony Iommi

Italian-language surnames